The Sydney Opera House Grand Organ is the world's largest mechanical tracker-action pipe organ. It is located in the concert hall of Sydney Opera House in Sydney, Australia, and was designed by Ronald Sharp, who was assisted by Mark Fisher, Myk Fairhurst and Raymond Bridge.

It is in six divisions, five manuals plus pedals, and is the largest tracker action organ ever built, with 131 speaking stops served by 200 ranks of pipes consisting of 10,244 pipes. It is a neo-baroque organ in style.

The contract for the construction of the organ was awarded in 1969, during the construction of the Opera House, and the organ was completed in 1979, six years after the opening of the building. Since then the electronics have been updated, including a major refit in 2002, but the musical specification is unchanged from that developed by Sharp starting in 1967.

In April 1994 the Sydney Opera House Trust awarded the contract for ongoing maintenance of the organ to Mark Fisher, one of the original staff of Ronald Sharp.

In addition to its mechanical action, the organ can be played remotely by an electronic system, enabling it to be played from a remote console, or a performance or passage can be recorded by a system built into the keyboards and played back by the electronic action. This system is used by visiting organists to select the registration (the combination of stops) that they will use, enabling them to stand in different parts of the hall and hear the results. Its stops are entirely electronically operated and programmed.

Specifications

Speaking Stops

Couplers

Gallery 
Additional pictures of the organ and its components.

References

External links
Sydney Opera House Grand Organ specification (PDF, 110KB.)

Sydney, Sydney Opera House Grand Organ
Sydney Opera House
1979 establishments in Australia